Usogawa Dam is a rockfill dam located in Shiga prefecture in Japan. The dam is used for flood control. The catchment area of the dam is 7.8 km2. The dam impounds about 17  ha of land when full and can store 2900 thousand cubic meters of water. The construction of the dam was started on 1971 and completed in 1979.

References

Dams in Shiga Prefecture
1979 establishments in Japan